Rosularia is a small genus of the family Crassulaceae. It includes about 28-35 species from Europe, the Himalayas, and northern Africa.

Taxonomy
Rosularia was originally described by De Candolle (1828) as a section of the genus Umbilicus, and raised to the level of genus by Stapf (1923) Thus the genus bears the botanical authority (DC) Stapf of both authors.

In 1930 Berger included it in family Crassulaceae subfamily Sedoideae, as one of 9 genera. He further divided it into two sections (Eu-Rosularia and Ornithogalopsis) and further series, transferring some species of Sedum to it. Since then a number of species have been transferred in and out of the genus, including S. sempervivoides, which at one stage was placed in Prometheum. The genus Sempervivella was submerged in Rosularia. The genus is now placed within the Leucosedum clade, tribe Sedeae, subfamily Sempervivoideae of the Crassulaceae, but is embedded within Sedum paraphyletically.

Species
Rosularia contains about 28 species. The following species and subspecies were accepted by The Plant List (2013):

 Rosularia adenotricha (Wall. ex Edgew.) C.-A. Jansson
 Rosularia adenotricha subsp. viguieri  (Raym.-Hamet) C.-A. Jansson
 Rosularia aizoon (Fenzl) A. Berger
 Rosularia alpestris (Kar. & Kir.) Boriss
 Rosularia alpestris subsp. marnieri(Raymond-Hamet ex H. Ohba) Eggli 
 Rosularia blepharophylla Eggli 
 Rosularia borissovae U.P.Pratov 
 Rosularia chrysantha  (Boiss. & Heldr. ex Boiss.) Takhtajan 
 Rosularia cypria (Holmboe) Meikle
 Rosularia davisii Muirhead 
 Rosularia elymaitica  (Boiss. & Hausskn. ex Boiss.) A. Berger 
 Rosularia glabra  (Regel & Winkl.) A.Berger 
 Rosularia globulariifolia  (Fenzl) A. Berger 
 Rosularia haussknechtii  (Boiss. & Reut. ex Boiss.) A. Berger 
 Rosularia jaccardiana (Maire & Wilczek) H. Ohba 
 Rosularia libanotica (L.) Sam. 
 Rosularia lineata (Boiss.) A.Berger 
 Rosularia lutea Boriss. 
 Rosularia pallida  (Schott & Kotschy) Stapf 
 Rosularia pallidiflora  (Holmboe) Meikle 
 Rosularia persica  (Boiss.) A. Berger 
 Rosularia pilosa  (Fischer ex M. Bieberstein) Boriss. 
 Rosularia platyphylla  (Schrenk) A.Berger 
 Rosularia radicosa (Boiss. & Hohen.) Eggli 
 Rosularia rechingeri C.-A. Jansson 
 Rosularia rosulata (Edgew.) H. Ohba 
 Rosularia schischkinii Boriss. 
 Rosularia sedoides (Decne.) H. Ohba 
 Rosularia semiensis  (J. Gay ex A. Richard) H. Ohba 
 Rosularia sempervivoides  (Fischer ex M. Bieberstein) Boriss. 
 Rosularia serpentinica  (Werderm.) Muirhead 
 Rosularia serrata  (L.) A.Berger 
 Rosularia subspicata  (Freyn) Boriss. 

Distribution and habitatRosularia is found in arid and semi-arid regions from N. Africa (Morocco, Ethiopia), through the eastern Mediterranean to Central Asia (north of Tien Shan and east of W Himalaya), including Pakistan.

EcologyRosularia is an important larval host for the Central Asian butterfly Parnassius apollonius.

Uses
A number of species are cultivated as ornamental garden plants, and have been used in traditional medicine.

References

Bibliography

Books
 
 
 
  (full text at'' ResearchGate)
Articles
 
 
 
 
Websites
 
 
 
 

Crassulaceae
Crassulaceae genera